Leon Joel Osterweil is an American computer scientist noted for his research on software engineering.

Biography
Osterweil received a B. A. in mathematics  from  Princeton University in 1965. He received a M.A. in mathematics in 1970 and a Ph.D in mathematics in 1971 from the  University of Maryland.

He then joined the Department of Computer Science at the University of Colorado Boulder as an assistant professor in 1971. While there he was promoted to associate professor in 1977 and to professor in 1982, he was chair of the department from 1981 to 1986. In 1988, he became a professor at the University of California at Irvine and he was department chair from 1989 to 1992. In 1993, he became a professor of Computer Science at the University of Massachusetts Amherst.

Awards

In the year 1998, he was named an ACM Fellow.

His other notable awards include:
 ACM SIGSOFT Outstanding Research Award, 2003
 ICSE's Most Influential Paper Award, 1997
 ACM SIGSOFT Influential Educator Award, 2010

References

External links
 University of Massachusetts Amherst: Leon J. Osterweil, Department of Computer Science

Computer scientists
University of Massachusetts Amherst faculty
Fellows of the Association for Computing Machinery
Living people
Year of birth missing (living people)